The 2018–19 North Alabama Lions men's basketball team represented University of North Alabama during the 2018–19 NCAA Division I men's basketball season. They were led by head coach Tony Pujol in his first season at North Alabama. The Lions played their home games at the Flowers Hall in Florence, Alabama as first-time members of the Atlantic Sun Conference.

This season marks North Alabama's first of a four-year transition period from Division II to Division I. As a result, the Lions are not eligible for NCAA postseason play but can participate in the ASUN tournament. They could also play in the CIT or CBI if invited.

Previous season 
The Lions finished the 2017–18 season 15–13, 10–10 to finish in a tie for sixth place in Gulf South Conference play. They lost in the first round of the Gulf South tournament, losing to West Florida. The season marked the last season in Division II and the Gulf South Conference for the Lions.

Offseason

Incoming recruits

Roster

Schedule and results 

|-
!colspan=12 style=| Non-conference regular season

|-
!colspan=9 style=| ASUN Regular Season

|-
!colspan=12 style=| ASUN tournament

Source

References 

North Alabama Lions men's basketball seasons
North Alabama
North Alabama Lions men's basketball
North Alabama Lions men's basketball